General of the Infantry Jakob Friedrich von Rüchel-Kleist (25 January 1778, in Segenthin – 15 March 1848, in Danzig) was a Prussian officer during the Napoleonic Wars and a governor of Danzig (Gdansk).

Notes

References

1778 births
1848 deaths
Prussian Army personnel of the Napoleonic Wars
Generals of Infantry (Prussia)
Jakob